Puerto National High School-(PNHS) is a public secondary school of Cagayan de Oro and was founded in 2005 basically an annex school building of Agusan.

References

External links
Department of Education-Philippines
Cagayan de Oro-List of Public Secondary Schools
Public Schools' Masterlist Cagayan de Oro
Cagayan de Oro Official Website

High schools in the Philippines
Schools in Cagayan de Oro
Educational institutions established in 2005
2005 establishments in the Philippines